No My Darling Daughter is a 1961 British comedy film directed by Ralph Thomas and featuring Michael Redgrave, Michael Craig, Roger Livesey, James Westmoreland (credited as Rad Fulton), and Juliet Mills. It was based on the play Handful of Tansy by Kay Bannerman and Harold Brooke.
The film opened on 10 August 1961 at the Odeon Leicester Square in London's West End.

Plot
Wealthy businessman and single parent Sir Michael Carr (Michael Redgrave) does not know how to deal with his daughter Tansy (Juliet Mills), at that awkward age between teenager and adult. His close friend and employee ex-General Henry Barclay (Roger Livesey) has the same kind of problem with his son. Thomas Barclay (Michael Craig) left the military and has now tendered his resignation from Carr's automobile company.

Tansy chances to meet American Cornelius Allingham (Rad Fulton) at her father's office. The two teens soon become inseparable friends; she shows him around London, with her father blithely unaware of the relationship. When Carr has to go on a business trip to New York, he sends Tansy along with General Barclay on his fishing vacation in Scotland. She secretly arranges for Cornelius to meet her there. The two see the sights on his motor scooter and eventually go camping together (he sleeps outside the tent), without informing anyone. When Carr realises his daughter is missing, he finds some photographs of Cornelius, assumes the worst, and gets the police to initiate a nationwide manhunt.

Thomas, who had earlier resented having to get Tansy out of her various scrapes, uses his army training and tracks the pair down. He sneaks up, knocks Cornelius out, and takes a resisting Tansy back to London.

When Cornelius wakes up, he discovers he is wanted by the police. He turns himself in to Carr, then reveals that he is the millionaire son of Carr's business associate and that he holds a sizable number of shares in Carr's own company. Relieved that his daughter hadn't been seduced by a fortune 
hunter, Carr gives his blessing to their marriage. However, Thomas discovers that he is in love with Tansy; when he kisses her, she realizes she feels the same about him and they elope. General Barclay is furious at first, having gone to great lengths to arrange the wedding, until Carr reminds him that this was what they had hoped for.

Cast
 Michael Redgrave as Sir Michael Carr
 Michael Craig as Thomas Barclay
 Roger Livesey as General Henry Barclay
 James Westmoreland as Cornelius Allingham (credited as Rad Fulton)
 Juliet Mills as Tansy Carr
 Renée Houston as Miss Yardley, Carr's secretary
 Joan Sims as Second Typist
 Peter Barkworth as Charles
 David Lodge as Flanigan
 Terry Scott as Constable

Production
It was Michael Craig's fourth film with Box and Thomas and he said it "wasn't really bad" with Juliet Mills being "very good indeed" and Redgrave and Livesey giving "the proceedings a touch of class." He also enjoyed filming at Loch Lomond.

References

External links 
 
No My Darling Daughter at Britmovie

1961 films
British black-and-white films
1960s English-language films
British films based on plays
Films directed by Ralph Thomas
1961 romantic comedy films
Films shot at Pinewood Studios
British romantic comedy films
1960s British films